Abaïna Louis (born 29 November 2001) is a Haitian footballer who plays as a forward for AS Tigresses and the Haiti women's national team.

Career
Louis has appeared for the Haiti women's national team, including in the 2020 CONCACAF Women's Olympic Qualifying Championship against the United States on 28 January 2020. She came on as a substitute in the 88th minute for Roseline Éloissaint, with the match finishing as a 0–4 loss.

References

External links
 

2001 births
Living people
Haitian women's footballers
Haiti women's international footballers
Women's association football forwards